Nice People is a lost 1922 American silent drama film directed by William C. deMille and starring Wallace Reid and Bebe Daniels. The movie is based on the 1921 Broadway play of the same name by Rachel Crothers that had starred Tallulah Bankhead, Francine Larrimore, and Katharine Cornell. Vincent Coleman played Reid's part of the Captain.

Cast
Wallace Reid as Captain Billy Wade
Bebe Daniels as Theodora Gloucester (played by Francine Larrimore on Broadway)
Conrad Nagel as Scotty White
Julia Faye as Hallie Livingston (played by Tallulah Bankhead on Broadway)
Claire McDowell as Margaret Rainsford
Edward Martindel as Hubert Gloucester
Eve Southern as Eileen Baxter-Jones (played by Katharine Cornell on Broadway)
Bertram Johns as Trevor Leeds
William Boyd as Oliver Comstock
Ethel Wales as Mrs. Heyfer

See also
The House That Shadows Built (1931 promotional film by Paramount with excerpt of this film)
 Wallace Reid filmography

References

External links

Film still with Bebe Daniels at silenthollywood.com

1922 films
American silent feature films
Lost American films
Films directed by William C. deMille
Paramount Pictures films
American films based on plays
1922 drama films
Silent American drama films
American black-and-white films
1922 lost films
Lost drama films
1920s American films
1920s English-language films